Marcelliopsis is a genus of flowering plants belonging to the family Amaranthaceae. It is within the subfamily of Amaranthoideae.

It is native to Angola and Namibia.

The genus name of Marcelliopsis is in honour of Claudia Marcella Major (fl. 1st century BC), Roman noblewoman. 
It was first described and published in H.G.A.Engler, Nat. Pflanzenfam. ed.2, Vol.16c on page 48 in 1934.

Known species
According to Kew:
Marcelliopsis denudata 
Marcelliopsis splendens 
Marcelliopsis welwitschii

References

Amaranthaceae
Amaranthaceae genera
Plants described in 1845
Flora of Angola
Flora of Namibia